Chamber Concerto or Kammerkonzert may refer to any chamber concerto, including:

 Chamber Concerto (Adams), by Samuel Adams (1985)
 Kammerkonzert, by Alban Berg (1923–25)
 Kammerkonzert, by Karl Amadeus Hartmann (1930–35)
 Kammerkonzert, by Hans Werner Henze (1946)
 Chamber Concerto nos.1-3: Adrift (2008); Phantasy Caprices (2009); Storyteller (2011), by Peter Seabourne
 Chamber Concerto (Ligeti), by György Ligeti (1969–70)

See also 
 Concerto da camera